Rowing with the Wind a.k.a. Remando al viento (Spanish title) is a 1988 Spanish film written and directed by Gonzalo Suárez.  The film won seven Goya Awards. It concerns the English writer Mary Shelley and her circle.

Plot
In the summer of 1816, English poet Percy Shelley, his soon to be wife Mary Shelley (daughter of William Godwin and Mary Wollstonecraft), and Mary's stepsister and companion Claire Clairmont take a holiday with Lord Byron and his physician John William Polidori at a villa rented by Byron at Lake Leman, Switzerland. 

Byron challenges each of the friends to write a horror story, and Mary begins her novel, Frankenstein. She imagines the monster becoming real, and for the next six years, as tragedy befalls those around her, she believes the creature of her imagination is the cause. 

Meanwhile, Claire has Byron's baby, is estranged from him and barred from seeing her daughter. Byron and Percy continue their friendship, the one hedonistic, the other idealistic. The Shelleys move near Pisa.

Cast

 Hugh Grant as Lord Byron

 Lizzy McInnerny as Mary Shelley

 Valentine Pelka as Percy Bysshe Shelley

 Elizabeth Hurley as Claire Clairmont

 José Luis Gómez as John Polidori

 Virginia Mataix as Elisa

 Ronan Vibert as Fletcher

References

External links 

1988 films
Spanish biographical films
Films about writers
Films set in the 1810s
Films shot in Italy
Films shot in Madrid
Films shot in Norway
Films shot in Spain
Films shot in Switzerland
English-language Spanish films
Films set in Switzerland
Pisa in fiction
Cultural depictions of Lord Byron
Cultural depictions of John Polidori
Cultural depictions of Mary Shelley
Cultural depictions of Percy Bysshe Shelley
1980s English-language films